Kim Ho-dong (Hanja: 金浩東; often written in English-language literature as Hodong Kim or Ho-dong Kim) (born 1954) is a Korean historian, professor at Seoul National University. His research interests include nomadic societies of Central Asia and their interaction with the Chinese state.

Life 
Kim Hodong studied with Min Tuki in Seoul, and did his doctoral graduate work at Harvard University, where he was a student of Joseph Fletcher, Jr. Omeljan Pritsak, Philip A. Kuhn, and Thomas Barfield were on his dissertation committee as well.

Currently he is a professor of Asian history at the Institute of Historical Research of Seoul National University. He also served as the president of the Korean Association for Central Asian Studies from 2003 to 2006.

Works 
Kim's best known work is his 2004 book, "Holy War in China: The Muslim Rebellion and State in Chinese Central Asia, 1864-1877", which had developed from his Harvard doctoral dissertation. This book offers a comprehensive treatment of the rebellion of Xinjiang Muslims (Hui, Uyghurs, and other smaller groups) against the Qing Empire in the 1864–1877, and the career of the Kokandian adventurer Yaqub Beg who had managed to become the ruler of a large part of the region. An extensive background on the power struggle between the Qing, the Khojas, the Kokand Khanate, and the indigenous local interests for power in Kashgaria in the preceding hundred years is provided as well.

The book draws heavily on the contemporary and near-contemporary Xinjiang Muslim sources, in particular Mulla Musa Sayrami's (1836-1917) Tarikh-i amaniyya and Tarikh-i hamidi, and Mulla Bilal's Ghazat dar mulk-i Chin.) It is the title of Mulla Bilal's work that became, in its English form, the title of Kim Hodong's book as well.

"Holy War in China" makes good use of the Chinese sources as well, as well as documents from the Russians, British, and Osmanlis who had come into contact with the rebels.

Despite its title, the book concentrates primarily on the rebellion in Xinjiang, discussing contemporaneous Muslim rebellions in the inner provinces of China only to the extent it is necessary for the Xinjiang narrative.

Kim is a co-editor of The Cambridge History of the Mongol Empire.

Books by Kim Hodong 
 Kim Hodong, "Holy War in China: The Muslim Rebellion and State in Chinese Central Asia, 1864-1877". Stanford University Press (March 2004). . (Preface contains some autobiographical information. Searchable text available on Amazon.com)
 Kim Hodong, "The Mongol Empire and Korea: The Rise of Qubilai and the Political Status of the Koryǒ Dynasty".  Seoul National University Press (June 2007). .

References 

 Françoise Aubin, Reflections on the Fletcher Legacy
 Institute of Historical Research
 Alexandre Papas, "Hodong Kim, Holy War in China: The Muslim Rebellion and State in Chinese Central Asia, 1864-1877 ", China perspectives, n°66, 2006, posted online  2007-06-01
 The Korean Association for Central Asian Studies 

South Korean historians
Historians of China
1954 births
Living people
Central Asian studies scholars
Harvard University alumni
Seoul National University alumni
Academic staff of Seoul National University
Members of the National Academy of Sciences of the Republic of Korea